Amit Hedvat (Hebrew:  עמית חדבת; born 2004) is a retired Israeli rhythmic gymnast. She won gold in the group All-Around at the 2022 European Championship and silver in the same category at the 2022 World Championships.

Career

Junior 
Hedvat was part of the national junior group for the 2019 European and World Championships, the group composed of Amit, Romi Paritzki, Emili Malka, Mishel Mialitz, Diana Svertsov won european silver with 5 ribbons, as well as world's team and 5 ribbons bronze.

Senior 
In 2022 Amit was named part of Israel's new national group, they debuted at the World Cup in Athens, winning gold in 5 hoops and 3 ribbons + 2 balls. Then Baku, where they got bronze in the All-Around and 5 hoops. Pamplona (All-Around silver), Portimão (All-Around gold) and Cluj-Napoca (All-Around and 5 hoops silver).

In June she participated in the European Championships in Tel Aviv, where the group won the All-Around and got silver with 5 hoops as well as the bronze medal in the senior team category along with teammates Shani Bakanov, Adar Friedmann, Romi Paritzki, Diana Svertsov, Ofir Shaham, and the individuals Daria Atamanov and Adi Asya Katz.

Shortly after the European Championships Amit retired from the sport.

References 

2004 births
Israeli rhythmic gymnasts
Medalists at the Junior World Rhythmic Gymnastics Championships
Medalists at the Rhythmic Gymnastics European Championships
Living people